Antisocial personality disorder (ASPD or infrequently APD) is a personality disorder characterized by a long-term pattern of disregard of, or violation of, the rights of others as well as a difficulty sustaining long-term relationships. Lack of empathy and a contemptuous attitude are often apparent, as well as a history of rule-breaking that can sometimes include law-breaking, a tendency towards chronic boredom and substance abuse, and impulsive and aggressive behavior. Antisocial behaviors often have their onset before the age of 8, and in nearly 80% of ASPD cases, the subject will develop their first symptoms by age 11. The prevalence of ASPD peaks in people age 24 to 44 years old, and often decreases in people age 45 to 64 years. In the United States, the rate of antisocial personality disorder in the general population is estimated between 0.5 and 3.5 percent. In a study, a random sampling of 320 newly incarcerated offenders found ASPD was present in over 35 percent of those surveyed.

Personality disorders are a class of mental disorders characterized by enduring and inflexible maladaptive patterns of behavior, cognition, and inner experience, exhibited across many contexts and deviating from those accepted by any culture. These patterns develop by early adulthood, and are associated with significant distress or impairment. Criteria for diagnosing personality disorders are listed in the fifth chapter of the International Classification of Diseases (ICD) and in the American Psychiatric Association's Diagnostic and Statistical Manual of Mental Disorders (DSM).

The equivalent concept of dissocial personality disorder (DPD) is defined in the International Statistical Classification of Diseases and Related Health Problems (ICD); the primary theoretical distinction between the two is that antisocial personality disorder focuses on observable behaviours, while dissocial personality disorder focuses on affective deficits. Otherwise, both manuals provide similar criteria for diagnosing the disorder. Both have also stated that their diagnoses have been referred to, or include what is referred to, as psychopathy or sociopathy. However, some researchers have drawn distinctions between the concepts of antisocial personality disorder and psychopathy, with many researchers arguing that psychopathy is a disorder that overlaps with but is distinguishable from ASPD.

Symptoms and behaviors

Addiction 
ASPD is one of the personality disorders most likely to be associated with addiction. This is due to their tendency towards impulsive and reckless decision making, which puts them at risk of developing a substance abuse disorder, prepulse inhibition deficiencies, misuse of oral administrations, drug overdoses, blood-borne diseases, shorter periods of abstinence, drug use at earlier ages, aggressive behavior, impulsivity, frequent illegal drug use, drug injections, and difficult interpersonal relationships. Substance abuse problems are far more common amongst people with ASPD who live in rural environments rather than urban ones. There are also gender differences between men and women in regard to substance abuse. Men who abuse substances are far more likely to have ASPD than women, who are more likely to have a mood disorder. The relationship between substance abuse and ASPD can be affected by other personality disorders. For example, one of the previously mentioned studies found that 27.6% of participants who had ASPD and alcohol abuse had more than one personality disorder. Heroin, methamphetamine, opiates, alcohol, nicotine, cannabis, polydrugs, cocaine, and crack cocaine are some prevalent drugs amongst people with ASPD. Alongside substance abuse, patients with ASPD are more likely to develop a gambling addiction.

Impulsivity 

Antisocial personality disorder has been associated with higher levels of impulsivity, suicidality,  and irresponsible behavior. Usually resulting in heightened levels of aggressive behavior, domestic violence, illegal drug use, pervasive anger, and violent crimes.  This behavior usually has negative effects on their education, relationships, or job.  Alongside this, risky sexual behavior such as having multiple sexual partners, seeing prostitutes, inconsistently using condoms, trading sex for drugs, and frequent unprotected sex is also common. Their impulsive behavior will usually jeopardize their own safety and the safety of others.

Emotions 
The violent and impulsive behavior present in ASPD has been correlated with chronic boredom. Other studies have found that people with ASPD tend to describe emotions with ambivalence, and experience emotions such as happiness and fear less clearly than others. They may also experience emotions such as anger and frustration more frequently and clearly than other emotions. People with ASPD can have difficulty mentalizing, or understanding the mental state of others. They also may display a perfectly intact theory of mind, or the ability to attribute a mental state to oneself and others, but an impaired ability to understand how another individual may be affected by an aggressive action. These factors possibly contribute to their aggressive and criminal behavior as well as their empathy deficits. Despite this they may be adept at social cognition, or the ability to process and store information about other people, which can contribute to an increased ability to manipulate others.

Criminality 
People with ASPD tend to experience more convictions, spend more time in jail, and are more likely to be charged with almost any crime. However, assault and other violent crimes are the most common charges. This disorder is also prominent among prisoner populations. Alongside other conduct problems, many people with ASPD had conduct disorder in youth, a disorder characterized by a pervasive pattern of violent, criminal, defiant, and anti-social behavior. Fire-setting and the destruction of others property is also a behavior commonly associated with ASPD and impulsivity. Fire starters with ASPD tend to have a history of robbery, harassment, threatening, blackmail, and difficulty fulfilling promises.

Limited empathy or remorse 
People with ASPD may experience a limited capacity for empathy and can be more interested in benefiting themselves regardless of the expense it has on others. They may have no regard for morals, social norms, and the rights and feelings of others. People with Antisocial personality disorder may have difficulties in sustaining and maintaining relationships, and some have difficulty entering them. Interpersonal relationships often revolve around the exploitation and abuse of others. People with ASPD may display arrogance, think lowly and negatively of others, and have limited remorse for their harmful actions and have a callous attitude towards those they have harmed. Although behaviors vary in degree, individuals with this personality disorder will typically have limited compunction in exploiting others in harmful ways for their own gain or pleasure, and frequently manipulate and deceive other people. While some do so through a façade of superficial charm, others do so through intimidation and violence. It is possible that people with ASPD may have intact cognitive empathy, but with a deficient theory of mind. Studies have found that people with ASPD have difficulty understanding other's emotions and mental states. It also may be possible that people with ASPD do not lack empathy but are less inclined to use it.

Comorbidity
ASPD commonly coexists with the following conditions:

When combined with alcoholism, people may show frontal function deficits on neuropsychological tests greater than those associated with each condition. Alcohol use disorder is likely caused by lack of impulse and behavioral control exhibited by antisocial personality disorder patients. The rates of ASPD tends to register around 40–50% in male alcohol and opiate addicts. However, it is important to remember this is not a causal relationship, but rather a plausible consequence of cognitive deficits as a result of ASPD.

Causes  

Personality disorders are seen to be caused by a combination and interaction of genetic and environmental influences. Genetically, it is the intrinsic temperamental tendencies as determined by their genetically influenced physiology, and environmentally, it is the social and cultural experiences of a person in childhood and adolescence encompassing their family dynamics, peer influences, and social values. People with an antisocial or alcoholic parent are considered to be at higher risk. Fire-setting, and cruelty to animals during childhood are also linked to the development of antisocial personality. The condition is more common in males than in females, and among incarcerated populations. Although the causes listed correlate to the risk of developing ASPD, it’s imperative to note that merely one factor is unlikely to be the only cause associated with ASPD and relating to a listed cause does not necessarily mean that a person should identify themselves with having ASPD.

Genetic 
Research into genetic associations in antisocial personality disorder suggests that ASPD has some or even a strong genetic basis. Prevalence of ASPD is higher in people related to someone with the disorder. Twin studies, which are designed to discern between genetic and environmental effects, have reported significant genetic influences on antisocial behavior and conduct disorder.

In the specific genes that may be involved, one gene that has seen particular interest in its correlation with antisocial behavior is the gene that encodes for monoamine oxidase A (MAO-A), an enzyme that breaks down monoamine neurotransmitters such as serotonin and norepinephrine. Various studies examining the genes' relationship to behavior have suggested that variants of the gene that results in less MAO-A being produced, such as the 2R and 3R alleles of the promoter region, have associations with aggressive behavior in men. The association is also influenced by negative experience in early life, with children possessing a low-activity variant (MAOA-L) who experience such maltreatment being more likely to develop antisocial behavior than those with the high-activity variant (MAOA-H). Even when environmental interactions (e.g. emotional abuse) are controlled for, a small association between MAOA-L and aggressive and antisocial behavior remains.

The gene that encodes for the serotonin transporter (SCL6A4), a gene that is heavily researched for its associations with other mental disorders, is another gene of interest in antisocial behavior and personality traits. Genetic associations studies have suggested that the short "S" allele is associated with impulsive antisocial behavior and ASPD in the inmate population. However, research into psychopathy find that the long "L" allele is associated with the Factor 1 traits of psychopathy, which describes its core affective (e.g. lack of empathy, fearlessness) and interpersonal (e.g. grandiosity, manipulativeness) personality disturbances. This is suggestive of two different forms, one associated more with impulsive behavior and emotional dysregulation, and the other with predatory aggression and affective disturbance, of the disorder.

Various other gene candidates for ASPD have been identified by a genome-wide association study published in 2016. Several of these gene candidates are shared with attention-deficit hyperactivity disorder, with which ASPD is comorbid. Furthermore, the study found that those who carry four mutations on chromosome 6 are 50 percent more likely to develop antisocial personality disorder than those who do not.

Physiological

Hormones and neurotransmitters 
Traumatic events can lead to a disruption of the standard development of the central nervous system, which can generate a release of hormones that can change normal patterns of development. 
Aggressiveness and impulsivity are among the possible symptoms of ASPD. Testosterone is a hormone that plays an important role in aggressiveness in the brain.  For instance, criminals who have committed violent crimes tend to have higher levels of testosterone than the average person.  The effect of testosterone is counteracted by cortisol which facilitates the cognitive control of impulsive tendencies.

One of the neurotransmitters that has been discussed in individuals with ASPD is serotonin, also known as 5HT. A meta-analysis of 20 studies found significantly lower 5-HIAA levels (indicating lower serotonin levels), especially in those who are younger than 30 years of age.

While it has been shown that lower levels of serotonin may be associated with ASPD, there has also been evidence that decreased serotonin function is highly correlated with impulsiveness and aggression across a number of different experimental paradigms. Impulsivity is not only linked with irregularities in 5HT metabolism, but may be the most essential psychopathological aspect linked with such dysfunction. Correspondingly, the DSM classifies "impulsivity or failure to plan ahead" and "irritability and aggressiveness" as two of seven sub-criteria in category A of the diagnostic criteria of ASPD.

Some studies have found a relationship between monoamine oxidase A and antisocial behavior, including conduct disorder and symptoms of adult ASPD, in maltreated children.

Neurological 
Antisocial behavior may be related to head trauma. Antisocial behavior is associated with decreased grey matter in the right lentiform nucleus, left insula, and frontopolar cortex.  Increased volumes have been observed in the right fusiform gyrus, inferior parietal cortex, right cingulate gyrus, and post central cortex.

Intellectual and cognitive ability is often found to be impaired or reduced in the ASPD population. Contrary to stereotypes in popular culture of the "psychopathic genius", antisocial personality disorder is associated with both reduced overall intelligence and specific reductions in individual aspects of cognitive ability. These deficits also occur in general-population samples of people with antisocial traits and in children with the precursors to antisocial personality disorder.

People that exhibit antisocial behavior tend to demonstrate decreased activity in the prefrontal cortex.  The association is more apparent in functional neuroimaging as opposed to structural neuroimaging. The prefrontal cortex is involved in many executive functions, including behavior inhibitions, planning ahead, determining consequences of action, and differentiating between right and wrong. However, some investigators have questioned whether the reduced volume in prefrontal regions is associated with antisocial personality disorder, or whether they result from co-morbid disorders, such as substance use disorder or childhood maltreatment. Moreover, it remains an open question whether the relationship is causal, i.e., whether the anatomical abnormality causes the psychological and behavioral abnormality, or vice versa.

Cavum septi pellucidi (CSP) is a marker for limbic neural maldevelopment, and its presence has been loosely associated with certain mental disorders, such as schizophrenia and post-traumatic stress disorder. One study found that those with CSP had significantly higher levels of antisocial personality, psychopathy, arrests and convictions compared with controls.

Environmental

Family environment 
Many studies suggest that the social and home environment has contributed to the development of antisocial behavior. The parents of these children have been shown to display antisocial behavior, which could be adopted by their children. A lack of parental stimulation and affection during early development leads to high levels of cortisol with the absence of balancing hormones such as oxytocin which disrupts and overloads the child's stress response systems, which is thought to lead to underdevelopment of the child's brain that deals with emotion, empathy and ability to connect to other humans on an emotional level. According to Dr. Bruce Perry in his book The Boy Who Was Raised as a Dog, "the [infant's developing] brain needs patterned, repetitive stimuli to develop properly. Spastic, unpredictable relief from fear, loneliness, discomfort, and hunger keeps a baby's stress system on high alert. An environment of intermittent care punctuated by total abandonment may be the worst of all worlds for a child."

Childhood trauma 
ASPD is highly correlated with emotional and physical abuse in childhood. Physical neglect has a significant correlation to ASPD. The way a child bonds with the parents in early life is important. Poor parental bonding due to abuse puts children at greater risk for developing antisocial personality disorder. There is a significant correlation with paternal overprotection and people who develop ASPD.

Cultural influences 
The sociocultural perspective of clinical psychology views disorders as influenced by cultural aspects; since cultural norms differ significantly, mental disorders such as ASPD are viewed differently. Robert D. Hare has suggested that the rise in ASPD that has been reported in the United States may be linked to changes in cultural mores, the latter serving to validate the behavioral tendencies of many individuals with ASPD. While the rise reported may be in part merely a byproduct of the widening use (and abuse) of diagnostic techniques, given Eric Berne's division between individuals with active and latent ASPD – the latter keeping themselves in check by attachment to an external source of control like the law, traditional standards, or religion – it has been suggested that the erosion of collective standards may indeed serve to release the individual with latent ASPD from their previously prosocial behavior.

There is also a continuous debate as to the extent to which the legal system should be involved in the identification and admittance of patients with preliminary symptoms of ASPD. Controversial clinical psychiatrist Pierre-Édouard Carbonneau suggested that the problem with legal forced admittance is the rate of failure when diagnosing ASPD. He contends that the possibility of diagnosing and coercing a patient into prescribing medication to someone without ASPD, but is diagnosed with ASPD, could be potentially disastrous. But the possibility of not diagnosing ASPD and seeing a patient go untreated because of a lack of sufficient evidence of cultural or environmental influences is something a psychiatrist must ignore; and in his words, "play it safe".

Conduct disorder

While antisocial personality disorder is a mental disorder diagnosed in adulthood, it has its precedent in childhood. The DSM-5's criteria for ASPD require that the individual have conduct problems evident by the age of 15. Persistent antisocial behavior, as well as a lack of regard for others in childhood and adolescence, is known as conduct disorder and is the precursor of ASPD. About 25–40% of youths with conduct disorder will be diagnosed with ASPD in adulthood.

Conduct disorder (CD) is a disorder diagnosed in childhood that parallels the characteristics found in ASPD and is characterized by a repetitive and persistent pattern of behavior in which the basic rights of others or major age-appropriate norms are violated. Children with the disorder often display impulsive and aggressive behavior, may be callous and deceitful, and may repeatedly engage in petty crime such as stealing or vandalism or get into fights with other children and adults. This behavior is typically persistent and may be difficult to deter with threat or punishment. Attention deficit hyperactivity disorder (ADHD) is common in this population, and children with the disorder may also engage in substance use. CD is differentiated from oppositional defiant disorder (ODD) in that children with ODD do not commit aggressive or antisocial acts against other people, animals, and property, though many children diagnosed with ODD are subsequently re-diagnosed with CD.

Two developmental courses for CD have been identified based on the age at which the symptoms become present. The first is known as the "childhood-onset type" and occurs when conduct disorder symptoms are present before the age of 10 years. This course is often linked to a more persistent life course and more pervasive behaviors, and children in this group express greater levels of ADHD symptoms, neuropsychological deficits, more academic problems, increased family dysfunction, and higher likelihood of aggression and violence. The second is known as the "adolescent-onset type" and occurs when conduct disorder develops after the age of 10 years. Compared to the childhood-onset type, less impairment in various cognitive and emotional functions are present, and the adolescent-onset variety may remit by adulthood. In addition to this differentiation, the DSM-5 provides a specifier for a callous and unemotional interpersonal style, which reflects characteristics seen in psychopathy and are believed to be a childhood precursor to this disorder. Compared to the adolescent-onset subtype, the childhood-onset subtype, especially if callous and unemotional traits are present, tends to have a worse treatment outcome.

Diagnosis

DSM-5

Section II 
The main text of fifth edition of the Diagnostic and Statistical Manual of Mental Disorders (DSM-5) defines antisocial personality disorder as being characterized by at least three of the following traits:

 Failure to conform to social norms and laws, indicated by repeatedly engaging in illegal activities.
 Deceitfulness, indicated by continuously lying, using aliases, or conning others for personal gain and pleasure.
 Exhibiting impulsivity or failing to plan ahead.
 Irritability and aggressiveness, indicated by repeatedly getting into fights or physically assaulting others.
 Reckless behaviors that disregard the safety of others.
 Irresponsibility, indicated by repeatedly failing to consistently work or honor financial obligations.
 Lack of remorse after hurting or mistreating another person.

In order to be diagnosed with antisocial personality disorder under the DSM-5, one must be at least 18 years old, show evidence of onset of conduct disorder before age 15, and antisocial behavior cannot be explained by schizophrenia or bipolar disorder.

Section III (Alternative Model of Personality Disorders) 
In response to criticisms of the extant (Section II/DSM-IV) criteria for personality disorders, including their discordance with current models in the scientific literature, high comorbidity rate, overuse of some categories and underuse of others, and overwhelming use of the personality disorder-not otherwise specified (PD-NOS) diagnosis, the DSM-5 Workgroup on personality disorders devised a dimensional model, wherein categoric personality diagnoses reflect extreme variations of normal personality traits.

In response to criticisms of the extant Section II/DSM-IV criteria for ASPD, namely its failure to capture the interpersonal and affective features of psychopathy, new criteria were proposed.

In addition to the new criteria, the individual must be at least 18 years old, the traits must cause dysfunction or distress, and should not be better explained by another mental disorder, the pathophysiological effects of a substance, or a person's cultural or social background. Also included as a "with psychopathic traits" specifier modelled after the Fearless Dominance scale of the Psychopathic Personality Inventory, defined by low Anxiousness and Withdrawal and high Attention-Seeking. Researchers have also proposed the inclusion of Grandiosity and Restricted Affectivity to better capture psychopathy.

Psychopathy

Psychopathy is commonly defined as a personality disorder characterized partly by antisocial behavior, a diminished capacity for empathy and remorse, and poor behavioral controls. Psychopathic traits are assessed using various measurement tools, including Canadian researcher Robert D. Hare's Psychopathy Checklist, Revised (PCL-R). "Psychopathy" is not the official title of any diagnosis in the DSM or ICD; nor is it an official title used by other major psychiatric organizations. The DSM and ICD, however, state that their antisocial diagnoses are at times referred to (or include what is referred to) as psychopathy or sociopathy.

American psychiatrist Hervey Cleckley's work on psychopathy formed the basis of the diagnostic criteria for ASPD, and the DSM states ASPD is often referred to as psychopathy. However, critics argue ASPD is not synonymous with psychopathy as the diagnostic criteria are not the same, since criteria relating to personality traits are emphasized relatively less in the former. These differences exist in part because it was believed such traits were difficult to measure reliably and it was "easier to agree on the behaviors that typify a disorder than on the reasons why they occur".

Although the diagnosis of ASPD covers two to three times as many prisoners than the diagnosis of psychopathy, Robert Hare believes the PCL-R is better able to predict future criminality, violence, and recidivism than a diagnosis of ASPD. He suggests there are differences between PCL-R-diagnosed psychopaths and non-psychopaths on "processing and use of linguistic and emotional information", while such differences are potentially smaller between those diagnosed with ASPD and without. Additionally, Hare argued confusion regarding how to diagnose ASPD, confusion regarding the difference between ASPD and psychopathy, as well as the differing future prognoses regarding recidivism and treatability, may have serious consequences in settings such as court cases where psychopathy is often seen as aggravating the crime.

Nonetheless, psychopathy has been proposed as a specifier under an alternative model for ASPD. In the DSM-5, under "Alternative DSM-5 Model for Personality Disorders", ASPD with psychopathic features is described as characterized by "a lack of anxiety or fear and by a bold interpersonal style that may mask maladaptive behaviors (e.g., fraudulence)". Low levels of withdrawal and high levels of attention-seeking combined with low anxiety are associated with "social potency" and "stress immunity" in psychopathy. Under the specifier, affective and interpersonal characteristics are comparatively emphasized over behavioral components. Research suggests that, even without the "with psychopathic traits" specifier, these Section III criteria accurately capture the affective-interpersonal features of psychopathy, though the specifier increases coverage of the Interpersonal and Lifestyle facets of the PCL-R.

Millon's subtypes 
Theodore Millon suggested 5 subtypes of ASPD. However, these constructs are not recognized in the DSM and ICD.

Elsewhere, Millon differentiates ten subtypes (partially overlapping with the above) – covetous, risk-taking, malevolent, tyrannical, malignant, disingenuous, explosive, and abrasive – but specifically stresses that "the number 10 is by no means special ... Taxonomies may be put forward at levels that are more coarse or more fine-grained."

Treatment

ASPD is considered to be among the most difficult personality disorders to treat. Rendering an effective treatment for ASPD is further complicated due to the inability to look at comparative studies between psychopathy and ASPD due to differing diagnostic criteria, differences in defining and measuring outcomes and a focus on treating incarcerated patients rather than those in the community. Because of their very low or absent capacity for remorse, individuals with ASPD often lack sufficient motivation and fail to see the costs associated with antisocial acts. They may only simulate remorse rather than truly commit to change: they can be seductively charming and dishonest, and may manipulate staff and fellow patients during treatment. Studies have shown that outpatient therapy is not likely to be successful, but the extent to which persons with ASPD are entirely unresponsive to treatment may have been exaggerated.

Most treatment done is for those in the criminal justice system to whom the treatment regimes are given as part of their imprisonment. Those with ASPD may stay in treatment only as required by an external source, such as parole conditions. Residential programs that provide a carefully controlled environment of structure and supervision along with peer confrontation have been recommended. There has been some research on the treatment of ASPD that indicated positive results for therapeutic interventions. 
Psychotherapy, also known as "talk" therapy, has been found to help treat patients with ASPD. Schema therapy is also being investigated as a treatment for ASPD. A review by Charles M. Borduin features the strong influence of multisystemic therapy (MST) that could potentially improve this issue. However, this treatment requires complete cooperation and participation of all family members. Some studies have found that the presence of ASPD does not significantly interfere with treatment for other disorders, such as substance use, although others have reported contradictory findings.

Therapists working with individuals with ASPD may have considerable negative feelings toward patients with extensive histories of aggressive, exploitative, and abusive behaviors. Rather than attempt to develop a sense of conscience in these individuals, which is extremely difficult considering the nature of the disorder, therapeutic techniques are focused on rational and utilitarian arguments against repeating past mistakes. These approaches would focus on the tangible, material value of prosocial behavior and abstaining from antisocial behavior. However, the impulsive and aggressive nature of those with this disorder may limit the effectiveness of this form of therapy.

The use of medications in treating antisocial personality disorder is still poorly explored, and no medications have been approved by the FDA to specifically treat ASPD. A 2020 Cochrane review of studies that explored the use of pharmaceuticals in ASPD patients, of which eight studies met the selection criteria for review, concluded that the current body of evidence was inconclusive for recommendations concerning the use of pharmaceuticals in treating the various issues of ASPD. Nonetheless, psychiatric medications such as antipsychotics, antidepressants, and mood stabilizers can be used to control symptoms such as aggression and impulsivity, as well as treat disorders that may co-occur with ASPD for which medications are indicated.

Prognosis

According to professor Emily Simonoff of the Institute of Psychiatry, Psychology and Neuroscience, there are many variables that are consistently connected to ASPD, such as: childhood hyperactivity and conduct disorder, criminality in adulthood, lower IQ scores and reading problems. The strongest relationship between these variables and ASPD are childhood hyperactivity and conduct disorder. Additionally, children who grow up with a predisposition of ASPD and interact with other delinquent children are likely to later be diagnosed with ASPD. Like many disorders, genetics play a role in this disorder but the environment holds an undeniable role in its development.

Boys are almost twice as likely to meet all of the diagnostic criteria for ASPD than girls (40% versus 25%) and they will often start showing symptoms of the disorder much earlier in life. Children that do not show symptoms of the disease through age 15 will almost never develop ASPD later in life. If adults exhibit milder symptoms of ASPD, it is likely that they never met the criteria for the disorder in their childhood and were consequently never diagnosed. Overall, symptoms of ASPD tend to peak in late teens and early twenties, but can often reduce or improve through age 40.

ASPD is ultimately a lifelong disorder that has chronic consequences, though some of these can be moderated over time. There may be a high variability of the long-term outlook of antisocial personality disorder. The treatment of this disorder can be successful, but it entails unique difficulties. It is unlikely to see rapid change especially when the condition is severe. In fact, past studies revealed that remission rates were small, with up to only 31% rates of improvement instead of remittance. As a result of the characteristics of ASPD (e.g., displaying charm in effort of personal gain, manipulation), patients seeking treatment (mandated or otherwise) may appear to be "cured" in order to get out of treatment. According to definitions found in the DSM-5, people with ASPD can be deceitful and intimidating in their relationships. When they are caught doing something wrong, they often appear to be unaffected and unemotional about the consequences. Over time, continual behavior that lacks empathy and concern may lead to someone with ASPD taking advantage of the kindness of others, including his or her therapist.

Without proper treatment, individuals with ASPD could lead a life that brings about harm to themselves or others. This can be detrimental to their families and careers. Those with ASPD lack interpersonal skills (e.g., lack of remorse, lack of empathy, lack of emotional-processing skills). As a result of the inability to create and maintain healthy relationships due to the lack of interpersonal skills, individuals with ASPD may find themselves in predicaments such as divorce, unemployment, homelessness and even premature death by suicide. They also see higher rates of committed crime, reaching peaks in their late teens and often committing higher-severity crimes in their younger ages of diagnoses. Comorbidity of other mental illnesses such as depression or substance use disorder is prevalent among patients with ASPD. People with ASPD are also more likely to commit homicides and other crimes. Those who are imprisoned longer often see higher rates of improvement with symptoms of ASPD than others who have been imprisoned for a shorter amount of time.

According to one study, aggressive tendencies show in about 72% of all male patients diagnosed with ASPD. About 29% of the men studied with ASPD also showed a prevalence of pre-meditated aggression. Based on the evidence in the study, the researchers concluded that aggression in patients with ASPD is mostly impulsive, though there are some long-term evidences of pre-meditated aggressions. It often occurs that those with higher psychopathic traits will exhibit the pre-meditated aggressions to those around them. Over the course of a patient's life with ASPD, he or she can exhibit this aggressive behavior and harm those close to him or her.

Additionally, many people (especially adults) who have been diagnosed with ASPD become burdens to their close relatives, peers, and caretakers. Harvard Medical School recommends that time and resources be spent treating victims who have been affected by someone with ASPD, because the patient with ASPD may not respond to the administered therapies.  In fact, a patient with ASPD may only accept treatment when ordered by a court, which will make their course of treatment difficult and severe. Because of the challenges in treatment, the patient's family and close friends must take an active role in decisions about therapies that are offered to the patient. Ultimately, there must be a group effort to aid the long-term effects of the disorder.

Epidemiology
The estimated lifetime prevalence of ASPD amongst the general population falls within 1 to 4%, skewed towards men with 6% and 2% women. As seen in two North American studies and two European studies, ASPD is more commonly seen in men than in women, with men three to five times more likely to be diagnosed with ASPD than women. The prevalence of ASPD is even higher in selected populations, like prisons, where there is a preponderance of violent offenders. It has been found that the prevalence of ASPD among prisoners is just under 50%. Similarly, the prevalence of ASPD is higher among patients in alcohol or other drug (AOD) use treatment programs than in the general population, suggesting a link between ASPD and AOD use and dependence. As part of the Epidemiological Catchment Area (ECA) study, men with ASPD were found to be three to five times more likely to excessively use alcohol and illicit substances than those men without ASPD. While ASPD occurs more often in men than women, there was found to be increased severity of this substance use in women with ASPD. In a study conducted with both men and women with ASPD, women were more likely to misuse substances compared to their male counterparts.

Homelessness is also common amongst people with ASPD. A study on 31 youths of San Francisco and 56 youths in Chicago found that 84% and 48% of the homeless met the diagnostic criteria for ASPD respectively. Another study on the homeless found that 25% of participants had ASPD.

Individuals with ASPD are at an elevated risk for suicide. Some studies suggest this increase in suicidality is in part due to the association between suicide and symptoms or trends within ASPD, such as criminality and substance use. Offspring of people with ASPD are also at risk. Some research suggests that negative or traumatic experiences in childhood, perhaps as a result of the choices a parent with ASPD might make, can be a predictor of delinquency later on in the child's life. Additionally, with variability between situations, children of a parent with ASPD may face consequences of delinquency if they're raised in an environment in which crime and violence is common. Suicide is a leading cause of death among youth who display antisocial behavior, especially when mixed with delinquency. Incarceration, which could come as a consequence of actions from a person with ASPD, is a predictor for suicide ideation in youth.

History
The first version of the DSM in 1952 listed sociopathic personality disturbance. This category was for individuals who were considered "...ill primarily in terms of society and of conformity with the prevailing milieu, and not only in terms of personal discomfort and relations with other individuals." There were four subtypes, referred to as "reactions": antisocial, dyssocial, sexual, and addiction. The antisocial reaction was said to include people who were "always in trouble" and not learning from it, maintaining "no loyalties", frequently callous and lacking responsibility, with an ability to "rationalize" their behavior. The category was described as more specific and limited than the existing concepts of "constitutional psychopathic state" or "psychopathic personality" which had had a very broad meaning; the narrower definition was in line with criteria advanced by Hervey M. Cleckley from 1941, while the term sociopathic had been advanced by George Partridge in 1928 when studying the early environmental influence on psychopaths. Partridge discovered the correlation between antisocial psychopathic disorder and parental rejection experienced in early childhood.

The DSM-II in 1968 rearranged the categories and "antisocial personality" was now listed as one of ten personality disorders but still described similarly, to be applied to individuals who are: "basically unsocialized", in repeated conflicts with society, incapable of significant loyalty, selfish, irresponsible, unable to feel guilt or learn from prior experiences, and who tend to blame others and rationalize. The manual preface contains "special instructions" including "Antisocial personality should always be specified as mild, moderate, or severe." The DSM-II warned that a history of legal or social offenses was not by itself enough to justify the diagnosis, and that a "group delinquent reaction" of childhood or adolescence or "social maladjustment without manifest psychiatric disorder" should be ruled out first. The dyssocial personality type was relegated in the DSM-II to "dyssocial behavior" for individuals who are predatory and follow more or less criminal pursuits, such as racketeers, dishonest gamblers, prostitutes, and dope peddlers. (DSM-I classified this condition as sociopathic personality disorder, dyssocial type). It would later resurface as the name of a diagnosis in the ICD manual produced by the WHO, later spelled dissocial personality disorder and considered approximately equivalent to the ASPD diagnosis.

The DSM-III in 1980 included the full term antisocial personality disorder and, as with other disorders, there was now a full checklist of symptoms focused on observable behaviors to enhance consistency in diagnosis between different psychiatrists ('inter-rater reliability'). The ASPD symptom list was based on the Research Diagnostic Criteria developed from the so-called Feighner Criteria from 1972, and in turn largely credited to influential research by sociologist Lee Robins published in 1966 as "Deviant Children Grown Up". However, Robins has previously clarified that while the new criteria of prior childhood conduct problems came from her work, she and co-researcher psychiatrist Patricia O'Neal got the diagnostic criteria they used from Lee's husband the psychiatrist Eli Robins, one of the authors of the Feighner criteria who had been using them as part of diagnostic interviews.

The DSM-IV maintained the trend for behavioral antisocial symptoms while noting "This pattern has also been referred to as psychopathy, sociopathy, or dyssocial personality disorder" and re-including in the 'Associated Features' text summary some of the underlying personality traits from the older diagnoses. The DSM-5 has the same diagnosis of antisocial personality disorder. The Pocket Guide to the DSM-5 Diagnostic Exam suggests that a person with ASPD may present "with psychopathic features" if he or she exhibits "a lack of anxiety or fear and a bold, efficacious interpersonal style".

See also

References

Further reading

External links 

 DSM-IV-TR Criteria for Antisocial personality disorder
 Psychopathy and Antisocial Personality Disorder: A Case of Diagnostic Confusion

Anti-social behaviour
 
Cluster B personality disorders
Criminology
Forensic psychology
Psychology
Psychopathy